The Ik (Iq; , Iq) is a river in Russia that flows north to the Kama. It flows through the Republics of Bashkortostan and Tatarstan and through Orenburg Oblast. The left tributaries are Mellya, Menzelya, Dymka, and the right tributary is Usen.

The time difference between Bavly in Tatarstan and Oktyabrsky in Bashkortostan is two hours (Tatarstan uses Moscow Time and Bashkortostan uses Yekaterinburg Time). Therefore, the bridge through Ik (river-border) is jokingly called "the longest bridge in the world".

References

Rivers of Bashkortostan
Rivers of Tatarstan